The Protyre 2012 Formula Renault BARC season was a multi-event motor racing championship for open wheel, formula racing cars held across England. The championship featured a mix of professional motor racing teams and privately funded drivers competing in 2 litre Formula Renault single seat race cars that conform to the technical regulations for the championship. The 2012 season was the 18th Formula Renault BARC Championship; the season began at Snetterton 200 on 7 April and ended on 7 October at Silverstone, after fourteen races, all held in England.

Following a second-place finish in the final race at Silverstone, Scott Malvern secured the championship title after achieving three victories during the season and eleven podiums in total, driving for Cliff Dempsey Racing in the opening half of the season and Cullen Motorsport thereafter. MGR Motorsport driver Josh Webster finished the season as runner-up for the second consecutive year; although he won five races – tied for most wins in the season along with Fortec Motorsport's Seb Morris – during the campaign, a less consistent finishing record allowed Malvern to take the title by 33 points via dropped scores. Morris was third at the end of the season, having started half of the season's races from pole position in his first year in the series having graduated from Ginetta Juniors. The only other race winner was Webster's team-mate David Wagner, who finished fourth in the championship.

Teams and drivers

Race calendar and results
The series will form part of the BARC club racing meetings and will expand to fourteen rounds at six events, with two triple header events. A provisional calendar was released on 10 November 2011, with the final round still to be confirmed. This first provisional calendar showed Snetterton and Brands Hatch as the season opening triple headers. A revised provisional calendar was released on 2 December 2011, adding Silverstone as the final round, in support of the British Touring Car Championship. The round at Brands Hatch was replaced in favour of a round at Thruxton. The calendar also had major date changes, with the triple header events moved to Snetterton, and Donington Park.

Championship standings
A driver's best 13 scores counted towards the championship, with any other points being discarded.

Formula Renault BARC Winter Series
The 2012 Protyre Formula Renault BARC Winter Series with Michelin will be the 15th British Formula Renault Winter Series and the first season without the Formula Renault 2.0 UK championship, making this the first BARC championship only winter series. The series will commence at Brands Hatch on 20–21 October and end at Rockingham on 10 November, after four races at two rounds held in England.

Teams and drivers
The series organisers announced a 19 car grid on 18 October 2012, for the opening round of the winter series, with more cars expected for the Rockingham round.

Race calendar and results
The calendar was announced by the championship organisers on 7 September 2012, with the first round at Brands Hatch in support of the British Touring Car Championship.

Notes

Championship standings

References

External links
 The official website of the Formula Renault BARC Championship

BARC
Formula Renault BARC
Renault BARC